Joseph Perry Wood (October 3, 1919 – March 25, 1985) was a professional baseball player. He played one season in Major League Baseball for the Detroit Tigers in 1943, playing second base and third base. A native of Houston, Texas, Wood batted and threw right-handed. He attended Rice University.

In one season career, Wood was a .323 hitter (53-for-164) with one home run and 17 RBI in 60 games, including four doubles, four triples and two stolen bases.

Wood died in an accidental fire in his hometown of Houston, Texas, at the age of 65.

External links

Major League Baseball infielders
Detroit Tigers players
Henderson Oilers players
Beaumont Exporters players
Dallas Rebels players
Shreveport Sports players
Waco Dons players
Baseball players from Houston
Rice University alumni
Accidental deaths in Texas
1919 births
1985 deaths
Deaths from fire in the United States